The American Soccer League has been a name used by four different professional soccer sports leagues in the United States. The second American Soccer League was established in summer 1933 following the collapse of the original American Soccer League, which lasted from 1921 until spring 1933. The new league was created on a smaller scale and with smaller budgets. This league existed until over-expansion and financial limitations led to its collapse in 1983. Two successor leagues later operated.

History
In the fall of 1933, the second American Soccer League was established, surviving until 1983. Like the original ASL, this league operated primarily in the Northeastern United States for much of its existence. The league grew to become inter-regional in 1972 by adding several teams from the Midwest; the Chicago Americans, Cincinnati Comets, Cleveland Stars, Detroit Mustangs, and St. Louis Frogs. In order to compete with the growing North American Soccer League, the ASL went national in 1976, expanding to the Western United States by adding teams in Los Angeles, Oakland, Sacramento, Salt Lake City, and Tacoma. In addition, Bob Cousy was hired as commissioner and the league changed the standings scoring system to more closely resemble the NASL. ASL teams were awarded 5 points for a win, 2 points for a tie, and 1 point for each goal up to a maximum of 3 per game. The NASL awarded 6 points for a win and 3 for a tie, with 1 for each goal up to 3 per game. The ASL also had a limit on the number of foreign players each team could have in an effort to gain popularity among American fans.

While this expansion gave the ASL national exposure, the league and teams were no match financially for the NASL. On rare occasions, an ASL team would outbid a NASL team for a recognizable player, but more often than not, the better players in the ASL were offered more money to jump to the NASL. The high point in the history of the league may have been the 1976 championship game between the Los Angeles Skyhawks and New York Apollo; Skyhawks won 2–1 in front of over 9,000 fans. But by 1979, attendance was down, every team was losing money, and the league finally folded in 1983. After the ASL II ceased operations, several of its teams formed the original United Soccer League, which played seasons in 1984 and 1985.

Champions

1933/34 through 1943/44

1944/45 through 1983

Complete team list

Notes

References

External links
 Historical overview of the Soccer Wars
 Year by year standings

 
Defunct soccer leagues in the United States
Defunct top level association football leagues in North America
Sports leagues established in 1933
1933 establishments in the United States
1983 disestablishments in the United States
Sports leagues disestablished in 1983